Argishtikhinili  (Urartian: ar-gi-iš-ti-ḫi-ni-li) was a town in the ancient kingdom of Urartu, established during the expansion of the Urartians in the Transcaucasus under their king Argishti I, and named in his honour. It lasted between the 8th and 6th centuries BC. The town was founded on the left bank of the middle reaches of the Aras River. Over the centuries, the river channel has shifted to several kilometres south of the town.

History of studies
The historiography of Argishtikhinili is intimately tied with that of old Armavir, one of the capitals of Armenia. Moses of Chorene has written in his History of Armenia of the founding of Armavir by Aramais, grandson of Hayk, the legendary ancestor of the Armenians. Old Armavir, as was demonstrated by archaeological digs in the 20th century, was located atop the erstwhile Argishtikhinili from the 4th century BC onwards. In the 1830s, the Swiss traveller Marie-Frédéric Dubois de Montpéreux had suggested that a mound near the village of Nor Armavir could be the ancient fortress of Armavir. Interest in the site increased with the discovery in 1869 of cuneiform tablets, which turned out to date from the time of Argishti I and Rusa III. In 1880, excavations at the Armavir hill began, conducted by imperial Russian archaeologists ahead of the Fifth Russian Archaeological Congress at Tiflis.

In 1896, the Russian Assyriologist M.V. Nikolsky conjectured that beneath the ruins of Armavir is an even more ancient Urartian township. This was confirmed by later excavations.

Owing to World War I and the Armenian genocide, systematic investigations at Armavir began only in 1927, under the leadership of Nicholas Marr. Between 1944 and 1970, the academics Boris Piotrovsky, Giorgi Melikishvili and Igor M. Diakonoff conducted researches at Argishtikhinili. Their translations of Urartian texts contributed enormously to the understanding of Urartu in general, and Argishtikhinili in particular. Between 1962 and 1971, there were two simultaneous digs at the Argishtikhinili mound under the aegis of the Armenian Institute of Archaeology: one, investigating the remains of ancient Argishtikhinili, was led by A.A. Martirosyan, while the other investigated old Armavir.

Founding
Urartian documents indicate that Argishtikhinili was founded in 776 BC following the command of Argishti I, in the eleventh year of his reign. The establishment of the town was preceded by a long-term Urartian expansion into the Transcaucasus, which was aimed at controlling the fertile Ararat plain. From about 786 BC, the first year of his reign, Argishti I had begun a series of raids into the Ararat plain, the Akhurian River valley and Lake Sevan. In 782 BC, he founded the fortress of Erebuni on the site of modern Yerevan as a base for military operations.

The expansion into the Ararat plain was briefly interrupted by minor clashes with the Assyrians at the south-western frontier of Urartu. During Argishti's reign, Urartu was the zenith of its powers, and was able to easily overcome the armies of its neighbours, including the Assyrians. After four years of warfare, Argishti was able to occupy the Ararat plain, and by 776 BC was able to found a town in the middle of the valley. This appears to have been part of Argishti's grand plan to have a fortress on each corner of the Ararat Plain.

According to archaeologists, Argishtikhinili was intended to be an administrative centre rather than a military base, as from a military standpoint, its location was less than optimal. Argishti was then able to control the metalworking area of Metsamor.

According to the chronicles of Argishti I, Argishtikhinili was constructed in the land of the Azzi (or the Aza), and indeed, archaeological digs have demonstrated Bronze Age remains dating between the 3rd and the 1st millennia BC. No documents pertaining to the Urartian campaigns against the Azzi survive; it is conjectured that following years of warfare in the Ararat Plain, the inhabitants of Azzi may have abandoned their township before its occupation by the Urartians.

Town plan

It was between the western outskirts of Nor Armavir and the central part of the village of Armavir. Along the eastern and western sides of the rectangle were powerful fortifications made of stone. The western edge was a long ridge, while the eastern flank was situated on a basalt outcrop. Argishtikhinili was possibly the largest Urartian city in Armenia.

Buildings in Argishtikhinili included palaces, temples and dwellings, which were continued to be used without much change into the post-Urartian period.

Argishti I's network of irrigation canals, constructed between the Aras and its tributary the Kasakh, is contemporaneous with the town itself. Several canals visible to this day. Archaeologists believe that prisoners were used as forced labour in the construction of both the canals and the fortress.

The city was apparently more important for its administrative and economic control over the Ararat Plain. Indeed, it was the northern administrative and cultural capital of Urartu. Argishtikhinili's administrators oversaw the construction of the irrigation canals and regulated the distribution of economic goods in the region. Within the fortifications have been found large storage areas for wine and grains, as well as homes of civil servants and the military.

Following Argishti I, his son Sarduri II was also active in Argishtikhinili, constructing places of worship and greatly expanding the fortifications.

Fortifications
Unlike many other Urartian cities, Argishtikhinili was not located at an elevation, and thus its military value was small. The low flat hills upon which the town was built did not allow such mighty fortresses as protected Tushpa, Erebuni, Rusahinili or Teishebaini. However, to protect itself from unorganised attack, walls in the classic Urartian pattern were constructed along the mounds surrounding it. These were of mud brick atop a foundation of massive basalt blocks. The facade of the walls was divided by buttresses, and at each corner of the fortress there was a massive tower.

The better excavated western fortifications are on biggest of five elevations comprising the Hills of David. Their entrance was to the north on a packed mud ramp. The fortress comprised three units, each consisting of small rooms spread out around a central yard. Movement between the units was ostensibly regulated, given the narrow single paths that connected them, whereas within a unit, movement was free.

Agriculture
On the fertile lands of the Ararat Plain, wheat and other grains were cultivated. Vineyards and wineries were an important occupation. In addition, many citizens owned their own plots of land. There are also preserved remains of domestic animals, such as poultry and pigs.

Crafts
Many stone and clay manufactures have been found at Argishtikhinili, mainly for agricultural use. General- and special-purpose ovens were built of stone, as were grain mills of various types. Clay pots (karases) were used for the storage of various products such as flour and wine, which were regularly traded with neighbouring countries. Wine storage demanded huge pots which were partially buried into the ground.

Metalwork was heavily developed in Argishtikhinili. Numerous articles of iron and bronze have been discovered - agricultural implements, weapons, armour, jewelry, and so on. Archaeologists have also discovered stone and ceramic moulds for the casting of metal.

The agricultural vessels appear in various types and sizes, with swollen or stretched trunks, and with design patterns such as chariots.

Beer vessels with short necks and elongated trunks, clay censers, cheese-making vats, and jugs of various shapes have also been found. The jugs have been decorated with house fronts, geometric patterns, or leaf-shaped folds.

Other items include lamps, cups, phials, interment urns, and medical karases with lids. Ceremonial (religious) vessels have been found in Argishtikhinili, decorated with triangles, zigzag lines, or with stylised pictures of bird or dragon heads.

During the Urartian decline

The Assyrian defeat of the Urartian king Sarduri II began the decline of the Urartian kingdom. The next Urartian king Rusa I was unable to withstand the Assyrians either, and after a terrible defeat at the hands of Sargon II, killed himself. During his invasion of Urartu in 714 BC, Sargon dealt a serious blow to the Urartian religion, with his destruction of its chief god Ḫaldi's shrine at Musasir. The intensive construction that characterised the reigns of previous kings of Urartu slowed down severely, with some amount of building work continuing only in the Transcaucasus. In Argishtikhinili, building inscriptions from the reigns of Rusa II (son of Argishti II, ruled 685–639 BC) and Rusa III (son of Erimena, ruled c. 605–595 BC) have been found. Rusa II, intending to restore the glory of the cult of Ḫaldi, constructed similar temples at Argishtikhinili, Erebuni and Teishebaini, decorated with identical inscriptions that reinforce the Urartian gods by including the Babylonian god Marduk:In the new temple, let a goat be slaughtered to the god Ḫaldi, let a bull be sacrificed to the god Ḫaldi, a sheep to the god Teisheba, a sheep to the god Shivini, a cow to the goddess Arubani, a sheep to the armour of the god Ḫaldi, a sheep to the gates of the god Ḫaldi, a sheep to the god Iuarsha...  ...I made all this. Rusa, son of Argishti says: He who destroys this stele, he who profanes it, he who steals it, he who buries it in the earth, ... he who proclaims "It is I who carried out these works", and who replaces his own in place of my name, may he be destroyed by the gods Ḫaldi, Teisheba, Shivini, Marduk; may there not be either his name nor his family under the sun...

Under Rusa II, much attention was lavished on the fortress of Teishebaini; indeed, treasures from lesser towns, including Argishtikhinili, were transferred there.

Rusa II attempted to stem the decline of Urartu but was largely unsuccessful. A new granary, mentioned in an inscription by king Rusa III, was probably the large major building works in Argishtikhinili. Shortly thereafter, civilians and the army appear to have abandoned the fortress of Erebuni (at the time the main military centre in the Ararat Plain) on tactical grounds, and joined the main forces at the great fortress of Teishebiani, thereby putting Argishtikhinili at risk of attack. Indeed, around 600 BC, this town was captured and torched. Archaeologists have discovered evidence of assault weapons, major conflagration and extensive deaths of residents. Argishtikhinili was probably destroyed by the Scythians or the Medes, and thus lasted fewer than 200 years.

Current status
After the completion of excavations under the leadership of A. A. Martirosyan in the 1970s, Argishtikhinili was conserved with the major digs being covered up with earth. Some of the fortifications and foundations were strengthened and surface-cleaned. On the Argishtikhinili mound, a memorial stone was posted along with a plan of the town during its heyday. Most of the artefacts found in Argishtikhinili were transferred to the Sardarapat Ethnographic Museum of Armenia.

References

Urartian cities
Archaeological sites in Armenia
Forts in Armenia
Buildings and structures in Armavir Province